The Visual Effects Society Award for Outstanding Created Environment in a Photoreal Feature is one of the annual awards given by the Visual Effects Society starting from 2004. The award was originally titled "Outstanding Created Environment in a Live Action Motion Picture", and changed in 2007 to "Outstanding Created Environment in a Live Action Feature Motion Picture". It was again changed in 2009, this time to "Outstanding Created Environment in a Feature Motion Picture", and again in 2011 to "Outstanding Created Environment in a Live Action Feature Motion Picture". Before its final change in 2015, to its current title, it was re-titled in 2014 to "Outstanding Created Environment in a Photoreal/Live Action Feature Motion Picture".

Winners and nominees

2000s
Outstanding Created Environment in a Live Action Motion Picture

Outstanding Created Environment in a Live Action Feature Motion Picture

Outstanding Created Environment in a Feature Motion Picture

2010s

Outstanding Created Environment in a Live Action Feature Motion Picture

Outstanding Created Environment in a Photoreal/Live Action Feature Motion Picture

Outstanding Created Environment in a Photoreal Feature

2020s

Films with Multiple Nominations

3 Nominations
 Avatar
 Blade Runner 2049

2 Nominations
 Doctor Strange
 The Eight Hundred
 Gravity
 War for the Planet of the Apes
 Avatar: The Way of Water

External links
 Visual Effects Society

References

E
Awards established in 2004